A vampire tap (also called a piercing tap) was a device for physically connecting a station, typically a computer, to a network that used 10BASE5 cabling. This device clamped onto and "bit" into the cable (hence the name "vampire"), inserting a probe through a hole drilled using a special tool through the outer shielding to contact the inner conductor, while other spikes bit into the outer conductor.  The vampire tap usually had an integrated AUI (Attachment Unit Interface), from which a short multicore cable connected to the network card in the station.

Vampire taps allowed new connections to be made on a given physical cable while the cable was in use.  This allowed administrators to expand bus topology network sections without interrupting communications. Without a vampire tap, the cable had to be cut and connectors had to be attached to both ends.

See also
Network tap
Insulation-displacement connector, another insulation-piercing system

References

Ethernet cables
Networking hardware